The following is a list of products manufactured under the Sony Ericsson brand. Most of the models have been released under multiple names, depending on region of release, currently usually indicated by a letter added to the end of the model number ('i' for international, 'a' for North America, and 'c' for mainland China), but indicated on some (mostly older) models by a slightly differing model number. Typically, there is one version for the European and US market, and another for the Asian market. However, some models have yet more versions. Most "Walkman" branded models are also released as a non-Walkman version; such as Sony Ericsson W580 and the S500. These versions usually differ only slightly.

International phones 
Phones in boldface indicates that the phone is a smartphone.

S = Status, where P indicates under production, D is discontinued and U indicates upcoming .

C series: Cyber-shot

C902
The Sony Ericsson C902 was released during the second quarter of 2008. It is a java based feature device running on Sony Ericsson's proprietary A200 platform. A special feature was the presence of 8 touch sensitive keys using capacitive technology for the camera mode. The camera technology includes face detection and the music player is similar to the system used on the company's "Walkman" series handsets. The phone is the first in Sony Ericsson's new 'Cyber-shot' C-series of phones, designed to be a successor to the popular K800i and the K850. The C902 is featured in the James Bond film Quantum of Solace, and has been praised for its user interface design and its build quality. Although the device received favorable reviews, analysts did not expect it to reach the same level of popularity or sales as its predecessor, the K800i, because it was not intended to be a "flagship model."

CK series: Messaging phones

F series: Fun phones

G series: Generation web phones

G700

The Sony Ericsson G700 was announced at the Mobile World Congress (formerly 3GSM congress) February 2008 and is based on the Symbian OS 9.1 UIQ 3.0 platform. The handset has had below average reviews, with a lot of reviewers criticizing the phone for being priced too high as the better equipped G900 is in the same price bracket while others have lamented the fact that Sony Ericsson chose to implement the same technology that had been presented in late 2006 in the P1. A "business edition" also exists for the Sony Ericsson G700, which has no camera.

G900
Announced at the 2008 Mobile World Congress (formerly 3GSM congress) in February of that year, G900 is a mid-to-high-end smartphone based on the Symbian 9.1 UIQ 3.0 platform. The phone sports high quality sound, 3G, Wi-Fi, and a clear 5.0-megapixel camera.

J series: Junior phones

K series: Camera phones  
Some phones have Cyber-shot branding.

M series: Messaging phones

P series: PDA phones

R series: Radio phones

S series: Style / slider / swivel phones

T series: Tela phones 
NOTE: Sony Ericsson may release cell phones in one variants, indicated with a letter after the model number. For example Sony Ericsson t303 released in China was released as Sony Ericsson t303c.

V series: Vodafone phones

W series: Walkman phones 

NOTE: Sony Ericsson may release cell phones in three variants, indicated with a letter after the model number. Example: W200 was released as W200a (for the Americas), W200c (for China) and W200i (rest of the world). The default release letter for most models is "i" which means international.

X series: Xperia phones

Z series: Clamshell phones

Entertainment Unlimited series: Entertainment phones 
The first Entertainment Unlimited phones were announced and launched in 2009, creating a new category where the benefits of audio and images were "combined in smart, good-looking and high-performing devices."  Apart from first-rate audio-visual strength, what these products have in common are differentiating factors in the user interface, borrowing from the wider Sony Group UI-developments. Aino is the first product that connects into the world of the Sony PlayStation remotely via remote media play.  Vivaz is the first Sony Ericsson phone supporting high-definition (HD) video capture.

Greenheart phones

Overview
Note: These lists are not intended to be all inclusive. Some information may be missing, or out of date.

Features

Sony Ericsson mobile phones for Japan market

au by KDDI (previously as IDO and DDI Cellular) 

 CDMA 1X WIN models (CDMA2000 1xEV-DO)

 Cyber-shot Keitai S006 - The world's first 16.2-megapixel cameraphone with advanced functions. It features CMOS 'Exmor R' sensor, dual LED flash, ISO 12800, WIN HIGH SPEED service, and waterproof design. It also supports GLOBAL PASSPORT GSM & CDMA.
 BRAVIA Phone S005 - Its design is similar to S004. It supports WIN HIGH SPEED service.
 URBANO MOND - Designed for active elderly with updated functions and waterproof design.
 BRAVIA Phone S004 - High-speed waterproof phone from Sony Ericsson BRAVIA lineup using 1 GHz Qualcomm Snapdragon processor. It features OneSeg TV tuner, Motion Flow Lite 60 frame, 8.11-megapixel CMOS camera and supports GLOBAL PASSPORT GSM & CDMA.
 Cyber-shot Keitai S003 - The first 12.09-megapixel 'Exmor' CMOS cameraphone from Sony Ericsson Cyber-shot lineup with Dual-LED 'PLASMA' Flash and waterproof body. It supports GLOBAL PASSPORT GSM & CDMA.
 URBANO BARONE - Designed for active elderly with large keypad function. It supports GLOBAL PASSPORT CDMA.
 BRAVIA Phone U1 - The first BRAVIA phone for au's lineup with waterproof body. It supports GLOBAL PASSPORT CDMA.
 Global Keitai S002 - Compact, simple phone with GLOBAL PASSPORT GSM support and Talkman Flash feature.
 Cyber-shot Keitai S001 - Cyber-shot phone with 'First-Class' theme and it is the first Sony Ericsson phone using AMOLED display. It features 8.11-megapixel 'Exmor' CMOS sensor, GLOBAL PASSPORT GSM & CDMA, and premium design.
 Walkman Phone, Premier³ - Walkman phone which able to rip music directly from CD Player via connector. It features Clear Bass, Clear Stereo, and Sony's DSEE (Digital Sound Enhancement Engine) Technology. It supports GLOBAL PASSPORT CDMA.
 Walkman Phone, Xmini (W65S) - The smallest Walkman phone with illumination music control. It features Clear Bass, Clear Stereo, and Sony's DSEE (Digital Sound Enhancement Engine) Technology.
 Global Keitai W64S - Global and elegance design with GLOBAL PASSPORT GSM support and Talkman Flash feature.
 Full Change Keitai re (W63S) - The first Sony Ericsson phone with full-customization support both cover, keypad, antenna, and user-interface.
 Global Keitai W62S - Global design with GLOBAL PASSPORT GSM support and Talkman Flash feature.
 Cyber-shot Keitai W61S - The first Cyber-shot phone for au's lineup. It features 5.11-megapixel 'Exmor' CMOS sensor, Smile Shutter Lite, Kaokime Lite, and OneSeg TV Tuner.
 W54S - Stylish and elegance phone with OneSeg TV Tuner and Bluetooth support.
 W53S - Stylish phone with selected 100 Style-Up Panel cover.
 Walkman Keitai W52S - Walkman phone with visual music sensation.
 W51S - Stylish phone with backlight illumination panel.
 W44S - 2-way flip multimedia phone with OneSeg TV Tuner support.
 W43S - Stylish phone with elegance and beauty design.
 Walkman Keitai W42S - Walkman phone with music style design and illumination music control.
 W41S - Music-style phone which able to connect to LISMO!
 W32S - Style-phone with Osaifu-Keitai support.
 W31S - Multimedia phone designed for music.
 W21S - The first CDMA 1X WIN model from Sony Ericsson.

 CDMA2000 1x models

 A1404S II
 A1404S
 A1402S II
 A1402S
 A5404S

 A5402S
 A1301S
 A1101S
 A3014S

 cdmaOne models

 C1002S
 C413S (Sony)
 C406S (Sony)

 C404S DIVA / DIVA lite (Sony)
 C305S (Sony)
 C101S (Sony)

 PDC models
 Digital Minimo 511G (Sony) also called HD-50S
 Digital Minimo 527G (Sony)
 Digital Minimo 534G (Sony)
 Digital Minimo 604G (Sony)
 Digital Minimo 705G (Sony) also called D306S
 TACS model
 TACS Minimo T206 (Sony)

NTT DoCoMo 

 

 FOMA models
 Xperia SO-01B - Sony Ericsson Xperia X10 for Japanese market. It features additional functions like Sony's music store mora touch.
 Global Keitai SO706i - Global elegance phone with illumination panel. It uses Linux MOAP(L) operating system and supports WORLD WING 3G.
 BRAVIA Keitai SO906i - Second BRAVIA(R) phone for Docomo's lineup.
 SO705i - Smart elegance phone with illumination panel. It uses Linux MOAP(L) operating system.
 Cyber-shot Keitai SO905iCS - The first Cyber-shot phone for Docomo's lineup. It features 5.11-megapixel 'Exmor' CMOS camera, Smile Shutter Lite, Kaokime Lite, and Xenon Flash.
 SO905i - Multimedia phone with touchscreen function.
 SO704i - Stylish phone with illumination panel on the cover.
 BRAVIA Keitai SO903iTV - The first Sony Ericsson phone with BRAVIA branded.
 Aroma Keitai SO703i - Beauty and elegance phone with replaceable aroma sheet in the front cover.
 SO903i - Premium AV multimedia phone from Sony Ericsson for Docomo's lineup.
 FOMASTICK SO902iWP+ - Waterproof phone from Sony Ericsson for Docomo's lineup.
 SO702i - Stylish phone with selected Style-Up Panel cover.
 FOMASTICK SO902i - Candybar model with 3.2-megapixel CMOS camera.

 mova models
 RADIDEN (SO213iWR) - The first Sony Ericsson radiophone with AM/FM/TV band and dual-design.
 premini-IIS (SO506iS) - One of premini series with improved features and fresh design.
 premini-II (SO506i) - One of premini series with Memory Stick Duo support.
 premini-S (SO213iS) - One of premini series with sporty design. It doesn't have external memory slot.
 SO506iC - The first Sony Ericsson phone for Docomo's mova lineup with electronic payment Osaifu-Keitai function using Sony FeliCa chip.
 premini (SO213i) - The first and smallest, compact premini model from Sony Ericsson. It doesn't have external memory slot.
 SO505iS - Swivel music phone from Sony Ericsson for Docomo's mova lineup
 SO505i - Swivel multimedia phone from Sony Ericsson for Docomo's mova lineup. It is almost similar to global model S700i.
 SO212i
 SO504i
 SO211i
 SO503iS (Sony)
 SO210i (Sony)
 SO503i (Sony)
 ER209i (Ericsson)
 SO502iWM (Sony)
 SO502i (Sony)
 SO601ps (Sony)
 ER207 (Ericsson)
 SO207 (Sony)
 ER205 (Ericsson)
 SO206 (Sony)
 SO201 (Sony)
 SO101 (Sony)

SoftBank Mobile (previously as Vodafone and J-Phone) 
 UMTS model
 Vodafone 802SE - Vodafone Japan version of the V800
 PDC model
 J-SY01 (Sony)

TU-KA 
 PDC models

 TH291 (Sony) also called SO4
 TH281 (Sony) also called SO3
 TH271 (Sony) also called SO2 or Y202
 TH261 (Sony) also called SO or Y201
 TH251 (Sony)
 TH241 (Sony)

Sony Ericsson Japan phones

PC Cards or USB mobile modems 

 Sony Ericsson GC75e GPRS PC card Modem
 Sony Ericsson GC79 GPRS/802.11b Wireless LAN PC card
 Sony Ericsson GC82 EDGE/GPRS PC card
 Sony Ericsson GC83 EDGE/GPRS PC card
 Sony Ericsson GC85 EDGE/GPRS PC card

 Sony Ericsson GC89 EDGE/GPRS/802.11g Wireless LAN PC card
 Sony Ericsson GC95 UMTS/EDGE/GPRS PC card
 Sony Ericsson GC99 UMTS/EDGE/GPRS/802.11g Wireless LAN PC card
 Sony Ericsson MD300 Mobile Broadband USB Modem HSDPA/UMTS/EDGE/GPRS

Accessories 
Note: Lists are incomplete. Some information may be missing.

Bluetooth headsets 

 Sony Ericsson HBH-35
 Sony Ericsson Akono HBH-300
 Sony Ericsson HBH-60
 Sony Ericsson HBH-65
 Sony Ericsson HBH-GV435
 Sony Ericsson Akono HBH-600
 Sony Ericsson Akono HBH-602
 Sony Ericsson Akono HBH-608
 Sony Ericsson HBH-610(a)
 Sony Ericsson Akono HBH-660
 Sony Ericsson Akono HBH-662
 Sony Ericsson HBH-PV700
 Sony Ericsson HBH-PV703
 Sony Ericsson HBH-PV705
 Sony Ericsson HBH-PV708
 Sony Ericsson HBH-PV710
 Sony Ericsson HBH-PV712
 Sony Ericsson HBH-PV715

 Sony Ericsson HBH-PV720
 Sony Ericsson HBH-PV740
 Sony Ericsson HBH-PV770
 Sony Ericsson HBH-IV835
 Sony Ericsson HBH-IV840
 Sony Ericsson HBH-200 (12 character backlit display)
 Sony Ericsson HBH-DS200 (Stereo) (3.5 mm jack)
 Sony Ericsson HBH-DS205 (Stereo) (3.5 mm jack)
 Sony Ericsson HBH-DS220 (Stereo) (3.5 mm jack)
 Sony Ericsson HBH-DS970 (Stereo) (LCD)
 Sony Ericsson HBH-DS980 (Stereo) (OLED display)
 Sony Ericsson MH100 (3.5 mm jack + touch volume control + LED indicator) (bundled with HPM-78 in-ear plugs)
 Sony Ericsson MW600 (3.5 mm jack + touch volume control + OLED display + μUSB) (bundled with HPM-78 in-ear plugs)
 Sony Ericsson VH-110
 Sony Ericsson VH-410
 Sony Ericsson VH-300 (mono)
 Sony Ericsson VH-700 (mono) (noise shield + μUSB)
 Sony Ericsson HBH-IS800

Car-kits (handsfree)

 HCA-20 (11pin)
 HCA-200 (11pin)
 HCA-60 (fastport)
 HCB-30 (bluetooth)
 HCB-300 (bluetooth)
 HCB-400 (bluetooth)
 HCB-700 (LCD) (bluetooth)
 HCE-14 (gooseneck microphone) (11pin)
 HCE-24 (gooseneck microphone)
 CHH-300 car headset charger/holder

 HCE-16 (Advanced Music Mute) add-on for HCA-20/200
 HCE-26 (stereo music mute) add-on for HCA-60
sun visor handsfree (bluetooth)
 HCB-100
 HCB-105
 HCB-108
 HCB-120
 HCB-150
HCH-xx phone holder

Bluetooth watches 

 Sony Ericsson MBW-100
 Sony Ericsson MBW-150 Music Edition
 Sony Ericsson MBW-150 Executive Edition
 Sony Ericsson MBW-150 Classic Edition

 Sony Ericsson MBW-200 Contemporary Elegance
 Sony Ericsson MBW-200 Evening Classic
 Sony Ericsson MBW-200 Sparkling Allure
 Sony Ericsson LiveView (MN800) (also included in XP111 Fitness Experience Pack) (Android only!)

Speakers

Bluetooth speakers 
 MBS-100 stylish bluetooth speaker (with same charging port as HBH-DS205)
 MBS-200 bluetooth speaker (2 watts) with OLED display (uses BST-38 battery inside) (uses fastport charger) (also has 3.5mm input)
 MBS-400 bluetooth stereo speaker set - consists of MBS-200 as primary speaker and MPS-200 as secondary stereo speaker (connected via 3.5mm, no bluetooth, both need power)
 MBS-900 bluetooth speaker with integrated subwoofer (also has 3.5mm input)
 MS-500 waterproof outdoor bluetooth speaker (2xAA battery driven)
 RA3000 Wireless 360 Reality Audio
 RA5000 Wireless 360 Reality Audio High-Resolution Audio

Non-bluetooth speakers 
 MDS-60 desktop stand dock speaker (5 watts RMS) (either driven by battery or wall socket)
 MDS-65 desktop stand dock speaker (either driven by batteries (5xAAA) or wall socket)
 MDS-70 (CPF-MP001) 2.1 audio dock cradle with iR remote control
the following speaker drain their power from fastport (no batteries or wall socked needed):
 MPS-30
 MPS-60
 MPS-70
 MPS-75 portable stereo speaker that attaches to the fast port of Sony Ericsson mobile phones to allow loud music playback.
 MPS-80
 MPS-100
 MAS-100 Zip hard case (splashproof) for phone with integrated speaker
 MS-410 snap-on speaker stand
newer products without fastport:
 MS-430 Portable Media Speaker Stand with 3.5 mm jack and 2xAA batteries
 MS-450 Portable Audio Speakers for X8, X10, X10 Mini Pro only (has 3.5 mm jack but needs special connector for power)

Handsfree headsets (cabled) 
fastport models:
 HPB-10 / HPM-20 / HPS-20 / HPB-20 (mono / mono / mono / stereo) headset for old Ericsson phones with the old (11pin) connector (e.g. T610/T630/K300)
 HPM-10 stereo headset that includes an MMC card slot to allow the playback of mp3 music files (for various older Sony Ericsson mobile phones) (11pin)
 HPS-60 mono headset with non-removable jogging earbud (white-blue)
 HPB-60 mono headset with non-removable earbud (silver)
 HPM-61 stereo headset with non-removable earbuds (silver)
 HPM-62 stereo headset with non-removable earbuds (black)
 HPM-64 stereo headset included with some of the company phones, including a few walkman branded ones. This walkman branded version of this headset is also branded with BassReflex, which is a technology that improves the Bass quality. First headset with 3.5 mm jack to swap headphones. Comes in trendy colors.
 HPM-65 similar to HPM-64, but with jogging earplugs (earbuds which are half in-ear)
 HPM-66 similar to HPM-65, but with regular jogging earbuds - only one color (gray)
 HPM-70 stereo handsfree telephone headset is bundled with many of the company's phones. A microphone, call answer key and 3.5 mm jack to swap headphones are all built-in. Has in-ear plugs.
 HPM-75 fixed up the issues relating to the HPM-70's microphone - that is, when it picked up too much environmental sound - along with an upgrade in audio quality. (Not compatible with <=DB2010 phones e.g. K750, W810, ...)
 HPM-77 similar to HPM-75.
 HPM-80 stereo handsfree with built-in radio receiver, music controls and an lcd screen used to display current fm radio frequency. (compatible with W900i only).
 HPM-82 stereo handsfree with built-in music controls that is bundled with some of the walkman branded mobile phones.
 HPM-83 stereo (standard) handsfree with neckband.
 HPM-85 full size stereo headphones for Sony ericsson mobile phones. Has same control unit with microphone as HPM-82.
 HPM-88 stereo handsfree with noise cancelling function and non-removable in-ear plugs ( - due to the second microphone being inside one earplug).
 HPM-90 stereo handsfree with OLED display and music navigation.
 HGE-100 stereo handsfree (similar to HPM-82) with GPS built-in.
 MH-300 stereo handsfree with non-removable earbuds - Greenheart series
 MH-907 motion activated stereo handsfree with non-removable in-ear plugs

trrs 4-pole 3.5 mm jack (omtp only?) models:
 HPM-60J has non-removable earbuds
 HPM-77/J same as HPM-77 but with 3.5 mm jack
 MH-500 has removable earbuds
 MH-700 has removable in-ear plugs
 MH-810 has non-removable earbuds with remote control (for Xperia X10 mini (pro) and Xperia X8 only)
 further headsets with non-removable headphones: VH50 (mono), MH410, MH610, MH650, MH710, MH750, MH1

Cables and charger 
 ITC-60 TV-Out Cable (for C903, C905, Satio only)
 MMC-60 RCA stereo cable
 MMC-70 headphone jack stereo cable
 HCE-12 Antenna cable
 HCE-16 Mute cable for radio
 HCC-11/13/20/30 System cable for HCH-xx car holder

 CBC-100 Battery Charger (external battery charger)
 CPP-100 Power Pack (use your extra battery as 'powerbank')

USB 
 DCU-10 / DCU-11 For old Ericsson phones (11pin)
 DCU-60 Standard fastport USB cable (ca. 140cm)
 DCU-65 Fastport USB cable with ferrite ring core (ca. 35cm/75cm)

wall charger 
 CTR-10 Ericsson travel charger (old models)
 CST-13 450mA for old Ericsson phones only
 CST-15 350mA energy saving travel charger
 CST-18 350mA headset/handsfree travel charger 
 CST-60 450mA
 CST-61 450mA headset/handsfree charger
 CST-70 700mA
 CST-75 750mA (has female fastport connector to attach e.g. headset while charging)
 CST-80 700mA USB-A charger
 CMT-60 Micro travel charger (charge phone with AC-plug or 2xAA batteries [powerbank-like] - does not charge AA-batteries)
 CMT-10 Micro travel charger (similar to CMT-60, but without batteries)

car charger 
 CLA-11 Car charger (for old Ericsson phones)
 CLA-60 Car charger for cigar lighter
 AN402 / AN401 / AN402 car charger for cigar lighter (1200mA USB-A socket with cable)
 AN-300 (micro-USB only)

Docking stations 
 CDW-10 Desktop charger for Ericsson phones (11pin)
 DSS-20 / DSS-25 SyncStation for older Sony Ericsson phones (11pin) (with serial interface, e.g. T610/T630/K300)
 CSS-25 Desk Speaker Stand (similar to DSS-20/25, but with integrated speaker and buttons) (11pin)
 CDS-60 / CDS-65 Docking station
 CDS-75 Desk Stand
 MPP-60 Docking station with RCA cable (Music Power Pack)
 MRC-60 Docking station with iR remote control (uses ATmega168V μC)
 EC-100 Docking station only for Aino
 DK300 Multimedia Dock only for Xperia Play

Other products 
 MMR-70 FM transmitter (uses ATmega32L μC)
 MBR-100 Bluetooth music receiver
 CAR-100 R/C car (bluetooth - Android OSS project available)
 CCR-70 Memory Stick Micro (M2) USB cardreader
 IM-502 / IPK-100 Tripod for photo/video recording
 ISP-20/25/30/35/40/60/70/80/90 Stylus Pack
 MMV-200 Media Viewer Bluetooth (RCA + VGA out) (CF-Card, Memory Stick, SD Memory Card)
 MMV-100 Media Viewer Bluetooth (SCART)
 MXE-60 Add-on Xenon flash for various older Sony Ericsson mobile phones (e.g. W810i)
 MPF-10 Add-on LED flash for the old Ericsson phones with the old (11pin) connector (e.g. T610/T630/K300/etc.)
 MCA-10 / MCA-20 / MCA-25 / MCA-30 Cell Phone Digital Camera for older Sony Ericsson mobile phones (also known as the CommuniCam). (11pin)
 EGB-10 Gameboard is supposed to show the advantages in the preinstalled game "V-Rally 2" (e.g. for Z600 and T630) (11pin)

See also 
 List of Ericsson products
 List of Sony products
 Mylo (Sony)

References

External links 
 Complete list of current phones from Sony Ericsson 

Sony Ericsson products
Sony Ericsson products
Mobile phones introduced in the 2000s
Mobile phones introduced in the 2010s
Sony Ericsson
Sony Ericsson